The Bozeman Icedogs are a Tier III Junior ice hockey team located in Bozeman, Montana. The team is a member of the North American 3 Hockey League (NA3HL). The Icedogs play home games at the Haynes Pavilion located at the Gallatin County Fairgrounds.

History
Founded in 1996 by a Michigan-based investment group, the Icedogs played in the Tier II Junior A American Frontier Hockey League (AFHL) from 1996 to 1998. The Icedogs were forced to play their entire first season on the road when the ownership team’s funding fell short with their rink only half-built. Despite the circumstances, which left them practicing at times outdoors and playing all ‘home’ games in Helena, Montana, the Icedogs, coached by David “Smoke” Cole and captained by Brad Michalski, earned a .500 record and a position in the AFHL playoffs. Forward Kevin Wesolek set a league record for single-season scoring as he captured 1996–97 Rookie of the Year honors.

In the fall of 1997, the Icedogs moved into the brand new Valley Ice Garden, a state-of-the-art, 3,500-seat arena outside Bozeman.  Bill Martel, owner of the Bozeman construction firm that had been building the facility, took over ownership of both the team and the arena, providing the Gallatin Valley with its first indoor ice skating facility.  The rink opened to the public with an open house on September 14, 1997.

The Icedogs played their first game at the Valley Ice Garden on September 30, 1997, a 6-4 victory over the Butte Irish in front of a sellout crowd with Wesolek scoring the team’s first goal. The Icedogs went on to record sixteen- and seven-game unbeaten streaks while selling out nearly every game en route to a second-place finish in the AFHL. Bozeman fell to in-state rival Billings Bulls in six games in the Borne Cup Finals, but earned a berth in the Gold Cup National Championship Tournament, where they were eliminated in the first round of round robin play. Wesolek finished second in the AFHL in scoring and set a league record for career scoring, with 198 points over two seasons.

In 1998, the AFHL changed its name to the America West Hockey League (AWHL). The 1998–99 season brought less success for the Icedogs, who struggled throughout, and finished in last place in the AWHL, missing the playoffs for the first time. Forward Jimmy Sokol finished second in the league in scoring while linemate Jason Deitsch led the league in points-per-game.

During the 1999–2000 season, Cole was fired and replaced with assistant coach Dale “Duner” Hladun. The team failed to improve under Hladun, who was forced to leave the team due to visa issues and replaced by assistant coach Darren Blue. The Icedogs missed the playoffs for the second consecutive season.

In March 2000, the Bozeman Icedogs hired John LaFontaine, brother of National Hockey League great Pat LaFontaine, as head coach and director of hockey operations. LaFontaine immediately turned the program around, leading the Icedogs to a .500 record and playoff appearance in his first season as coach. 

In 2003, the America West Hockey League merged with the North American Hockey League (NAHL) and the Icedogs began playing in the Tier II NAHL.

In the 2005–06 season, goaltender Matt Dalton led the NAHL in saves percentage, setting NAHL records for goals against average and saves percentage. Forward Josh Heidinger led the league in scoring was voted the NAHL’s top forward. After defeating the Fairbanks (Alaska) Ice Dogs for their second Borne Cup title, the Icedogs fell to the Texas Tornado in the final game of the national championship Robertson Cup tournament in May 2006. 

Later in May 2006, the Helena Bighorns and Billings Bulls joined the Northern Pacific Hockey League (NorPac). The Valley Ice Garden was sold to a beer distributor and the Tier II Icedogs were dissolved. However, the Icedogs would also join the Tier III Junior B NorPac when the Bozeman Blackhawks took on the Icedogs moniker and began play in Bozeman’s Haynes Pavilion. In 2007, the NorPac was promoted from Tier III Junior B to Junior A.

In 2011, the Icedogs joined the other eastern teams of the NorPac and created a new American West Hockey League made up of teams in Montana and Wyoming. In March 2014, the new AWHL joined the North American 3 Hockey League (NA3HL) as the Frontier Division in the 2014–15 season.

The Icedogs were sold after the 2012–13 season to a local couple Alec and Kate Nisbet. The Icedogs and the entire league moved from the AWHL and joined the NA3HL after the 2013–14 season and became the Frontier Division.

Previous leagues
1996–1998 American Frontier Hockey League
1998–2003 America West Hockey League
2003–2006 North American Hockey League
2006–2011 Northern Pacific Hockey League
2011–2014 American West Hockey League
2014–present North American 3 Hockey League

Season-by-season records

Notable Icedogs alumni 
The Icedogs have had a number of alumni move on to NCAA Division I, Division III, and higher levels of junior ice hockey, and professional ice hockey, including:

 Ryan Carrigan (1996–1999) – Northern Michigan University (NCAA Division I) 2000–2002; Niagara University (NCAA Division I) 2002–2005; Rockford IceHogs (UHL) 2005–2007; Rio Grande Valley Killer Bees (CHL) 2007–2008
 Jason Deitsch (1998–1999) – 2006 UHL Rookie of the Year, assistant captain of Cincinnati Cyclones
 Thomas Hajek (1996–1998) – All-star and team captain of the Philadelphia Wings of the National Lacrosse League
Matt Dalton (2005-2006) – NAHL MVP (2006), Boston Bruins (2009-2010), Olympian for South Korea (2018)

References

External links
 Official Ice Dogs Website
 Official League (NA3HL) Website

Ice hockey teams in Montana
Sports in Bozeman, Montana
1996 establishments in Montana
American West Hockey League teams
Defunct North American Hockey League teams
Ice hockey clubs established in 1996